Keep Singing! A Benefit Compilation for Compassion Over Killing is a benefit album by Exotic Fever Records supporting the non-profit animal rights advocacy group, Compassion Over Killing (now known as Animal Outlook). It compiles fifteen tracks from various (vegan) artists in promotion of the vegan diet. A vegan cookbook is also included with the physical copy of the CD in the liner notes and as a downloadable PDF file, which features favorite recipes from each band. The album was released on January 29, 2008 in CD and digital download format through Exotic Fever Records.

Track listing
Gina Young - "To Cool to Cry"	03:37
Strike Anywhere - "You Are Not Collateral Damage"	02:36
Life at These Speeds - "Waefae"	02:05
Attrition - "No Control"	04:12
In First Person - "Shades of Gray"	01:36
Sean McArdle - "I Go Shopping"	04:31
Now Sleepyhead - "Pandemic"	03:15
Sinaloa - "To Our End"	03:10
Wrong Day to Quit - "Wounds"	03:40
Kathy Cashel - "The Human Animal"	03:14
The Vonneguts - "Tonight's a Sadist"	03:09
Ampere - "Conquest Success"	00:33
des ark - "Punks in the Park"	01:29
Off Minor - "Abattoir"	01:22
Junius - "Lost in Basilica"	04:21

References

2008 compilation albums
Junius (band) albums